Jacques Dulcy (born 11 January 1954) is a French equestrian. He competed in the team eventing at the 1996 Summer Olympics.

References

External links
 

1954 births
Living people
French male equestrians
Olympic equestrians of France
Equestrians at the 1996 Summer Olympics
Sportspeople from Avignon